Elachista utonella is a moth of the family Elachistidae found in Asia and Europe.

Description
The head is  grey in the male, whitish in the female.Forewings are rather dark fuscous or ochreous-grey, pale-sprinkled,lighter in female ; plical stigma elongate, black, preceded and followed by whitish marks ; a small tornal spot, and larger triangular anteriorly dark-edged opposite costal spot white.Hindwings are  dark grey.The larva is grey ; head brown ; 2 pale yellowish,with two brown spots. Dissection is necessary to separate the moth from the similar Elachista albidella and Elachista eleochariella.

There is one generation per year in Great Britain, but there are possibly two generations in continental Europe.
The larvae feed on lesser pond-sedge (Carex acutiformis), Carex brizoides, distant sedge (Carex distans), brown sedge (Carex disticha), star sedge (Carex echinata), Carex elata, glaucous sedge (Carex flacca), hairy sedge (Carex hirta), Carex muricata, greater tussock-sedge (Carex paniculata), Carex remota, greater pond sedge (Carex riparia), spiked sedge (Carex spicata), bladder sedge (Carex vesicaria), fescue (Festuca species), saltmarsh rush (Juncus gerardii) and Scirus sylvaticus. They mine the leaves of their host plant. The mine starts halfway the blade as an upwards running corridor. Later, it reverses its course and becomes an elongate blotch occupying half the width of the leaf. The frass is light green at first but becomes grey later. It is deposited in the lowest part of the mine. Pupation takes place outside of the mine. They are yellowish green to greyish with a black head.

Destribution
Elachista utonella is found from Fennoscandia to the Pyrenees and Italy and from Ireland to Romania. It is also found in the Russian Far East and Japan.

References

utonella
Leaf miners
Moths described in 1856
Moths of Europe
Moths of Japan
Moths of Asia
Taxa named by Heinrich Frey